Per Hækkerup (25 December 1915 – 13 March 1979) was a Danish Social Democratic politician, who served as Foreign Minister of Denmark from 1962 to 1966.

Hækkerup, the son of Hans Kristian Hækkerup, a politician, was active in politics from the end of the Second World War to his death in 1979. He was the chairman of the youth organization of the Danish Social Democrats from 1946 to 1952 and the secretary general of International Union of Socialist Youth from 1946 to 1951.

Hækkerup is most widely known for the agreement he reached with the Norwegian Minister Jens Evensen that gave Norway the oil-rich Ekofisk oil field in the North Sea. According to an urban legend, Hækkerup was drunk when he signed the agreement, but Danish historians today agree that the agreement was most fair and that Hækkerup was not drunk.

He was married to Grethe Hækkerup and is the father of Hans Hækkerup and Klaus Hækkerup.

References 

 Nikolaj Bøgh: Hækkerup. København 2003

1915 births
1979 deaths
Foreign ministers of Denmark
Members of the Folketing
Burials at Vestre Cemetery, Copenhagen